The Leader of the Democrats 66 is the most senior politician within the Democrats 66 (D66) in the Netherlands. The post is currently held by Sigrid Kaag who was elected on 4 September 2020 and who has been the serving as the Minister for Foreign Trade and Development Cooperation since 2017. Kaag is the second female Leader of the Democrats 66 and the first career diplomat.

History
The Leaders outwardly act as the 'figurehead' and the main representative of the party. Within the party, they must ensure political consensus. At election time, the leader is always the Lijsttrekker (top candidate) of the party list. In the Democrats 66, the Leader is often the Parliamentary leader in the House of Representatives. Some Democrats 66 leaders became a Minister in a cabinet.

Leaders

 After Boris Dittrich stepped down Lousewies van der Laan took over as Parliamentary leader in the House of Representatives. The Democrats 66 leadership election of 2006 elected Alexander Pechtold as Lijsttrekker for the general election of 2006 on 24 June 2006.
 After Alexander Pechtold stepped down Rob Jetten took over as Parliamentary leader in the House of Representatives on 10 October 2018.

See also
 Democrats 66

References

External links
Official

  

 
 
Democrats 66
Netherlands politics-related lists